This is a list of topics named after Hermann Weyl, the influential German mathematician from the 20th century.

Mathematics and physics

 Cartan–Weyl theory
Cartan–Weyl basis
 Courant–Fischer–Weyl min-max principle
 De Donder–Weyl theory
 Hodge−Weyl decomposition
 Majorana–Weyl spinor
 Peter–Weyl theorem
 Schur–Weyl duality
 Weyl–Berry conjecture
  Weyl–Groenewold product
 Wigner–Weyl transform
 Weyl algebra
 Weyl almost periodic functions
 Weyl anomaly
 Weyl basis of the gamma matrices
 Weyl chamber
 Weyl character formula
Weyl denominator formula
Weyl dimension formula
Weyl–Kac character formula
 Weyl curvature: see Weyl tensor
 Weyl curvature hypothesis
 Weyl dimension formula, a specialization of the character formula
 Weyl distance function
 Weyl equation, a relativistic wave equation
 Weyl expansion
 Weyl fermion
 Weyl gauge
 Weyl gravity
 Weyl group
 Length of a Weyl group element
 Restricted Weyl group
 Weyl integral
 Weyl integration formula
 Weyl law
 Weyl metrics
 Weyl module
 Weyl notation
 Weyl quantization
 Weyl relations
 Weyl scalar
 Weyl semimetal
 Weyl sequence
 Weyl spinor
Weyl representation
 Weyl sum, a type of exponential sum
 Weyl symmetry: see Weyl transformation
 Weyl tensor
 Weyl transform
 Weyl transformation
 Weyl vector of a compact Lie group
 Weyl–Brauer matrices
 Weyl−Lewis−Papapetrou coordinates
 Weyl–Schouten theorem
 Weyl–von Neumann theorem
 Weyl-squared theories
 Weyl's axioms
 Weyl's construction
 Weyl's criterion
 Weyl's criterion for essential spectrum
 Weyl's criterion for equidistribution
 Weyl's inequality
 Weyl's inequality (number theory)
 Weyl's infinitesimal geometry
 Weyl's lemma: several results, for example;
 Weyl's lemma on the "very weak" form of the Laplace equation
 Weyl's lemma on hypoellipticity
 Weyl's paradox (properly the Grelling–Nelson paradox)
 Weyl's postulate
 Weyl's theorem on complete reducibility
 Weyl's tile argument
 Weyl–Titchmarsh–Kodaira theory
 Weyl's tube formula
 Weyl's unitary trick

Other
 Weyl (crater)

References

Lists of things named after mathematicians
Weyl
Weyl